Eric Robert Carter (born March 6, 1970), is a former American professional "Old/Mid School" Bicycle Motocross (BMX) racer whose prime competitive years were from 1983 to 1998. He had the nickname "The Golden Child," and later in his BMX career, acquired the moniker "The Earthquake." More recently, he has been known simply as "EC." Beginning in 1996, he converted fully to mountain bike racing (MTB) and has become one of the most respected racers in that discipline of bicycle racing.

BMX racing career milestones

Note: Professional firsts are on the national level unless otherwise indicated.

*In the NBL, "B"/Superclass/"A" pro, depending on the era; in the ABA, "A" pro.
**In the NBL, "A"/"Elite" pro; in the ABA, "AA" pro.

Career factory and major bike shop sponsors

Note: This listing only denotes the racer's primary sponsors. At any given time, a racer could have numerous ever-changing cosponsors. Primary sponsorships can be verified by BMX press coverage and the sponsor's advertisements at the time in question. When possible, exact dates are given.

Amateur
JMC (James Melton Cyclery) Racing Equipment: 1982
VDC (Voris Dixon Company): 1983-Late 1984
Free Agent (support and factory): Late 1984–November 29, 1985
Hutch Hi-Performance BMX/Products: November 29, 1985–January 11, 1987. Carter left Hutch after the ABA Cajun Nationals and would be picked up by CW Racing just after the ABA Supernationals  after a brief "sponsorship" on Bicycle Center.
Bicycle Center (bike shop): January 16, 1987–January 23, 1987. Not really a sponsorship; he merely wore the jersey of his local bike shop during the ABA's San Bernardino, California race on January 17–18, 1987.
CW (Custom Works) Cycles: January 23, 1987–December 31, 1987. "CW" never stood for "Coast Wheels," as is widely thought; Coast Wheels was a bike shop that Roger Worsham owned. Custom Works was a completely different and independent company. This is in contrast with JMC (Jim Melton Cyclery), which did start out as a bicycle shop and then began manufacturing its own BMX components, including entire bicycles.
Revcore: January 1, 1988–April 1988. Revcore was owned by Roger Worsham, the same person who owned CW Racing. Revcore was a different product line, much like the aborted Shadow Racing (also owned by Roger Worsham) was in 1985. He moved the entire national CW Racing team to Revcore at the beginning of the 1988 racing season as a promotional move to publicize the Revcore product line.
Schwinn Bicycle Company: Early April 1988–December 1989. His first race for Schwinn was the NBL Peachtree National in Peachtree, Georgia on April 10, 1988. Eric would turn pro with this sponsor.

Professional

Schwinn Bicycle Company: Early April 1988–December 1989. Schwinn would drop its BMX racing effort after the 1989 season.
MRC (Mike Redmen Concepts): January 1, 1990–June 1990
Titan Inc.: June 1990–Late July 1990
Brackens Racing: Late July 1990–Late 1992. Eric would take almost a yearlong hiatus from BMX after the 1990 ABA Grand National and raced only infrequently to forestall burnout during the 1991 season. His first returning race was the 1991 ABA Fall Nationals in Yorba Linda, California on October 26 and 27. He got a first place in "A" pro on Saturday, and second place in "A" pro on Sunday. However, shortly afterward, he took another yearlong (approximately) break to race motorcycles and do other things outside of BMX racing, again racing BMX infrequently. It was an almost unbroken absence from BMX racing for more than two years.
Hyper Designs: September 1992–1995

Career bicycle motocross titles

Note: Listed are District, State/Provincial/Department, Regional, National, and International titles in italics. "Defunct" refers to the fact that the sanctioning body in question no longer existed at the start of the racer's career or at that stage of his/her career. Depending on point totals of individual racers, winners of Grand Nationals do not necessarily win National titles. Series and one-off Championships are also listed in block.

Amateur

National Bicycle Association (NBA)
None
National Bicycle League (NBL)
1986 16 Expert and 16 Cruiser Grandnational Champion
1986 16 Expert and 16 Cruiser National No.1
1987 17 Expert and 17 Cruiser Grandnational Champion
1987 17 Expert and 17 Cruiser National No.1
1988 18-20 Grandnational Champion
1988 18 & Over Expert and 18-20 Cruiser National No.1
American Bicycle Association (ABA)
1985 15 Expert Winter Season California District 22 (CA-22) District Age Group (DAG) No.1
1985 15 Expert Race of Champions Champion
1985 15 Cruiser Grandnational Champion
1986 16 Expert and 16 Open Grandnational Champion.
1986 National No.1 Amateur
1986 16 Expert Gold Cup Champion.

United States Bicycle Motocross Association (USBA)
1986 16 Expert Race of Champions (ROC) Champion.
1986 16 Expert Grandnational Champion
1986 National No.1 Amateur

International Bicycle Motocross Federation (IBMXF)
1985 15 boys (Expert) Canada Cup winner
1985 15 boys (Expert) Gold Medal World Champion
1986 16 Expert and 16-17 Cruiser Gold Medal World Champion
1987 17 Expert Gold Medal World Champion
1988 18 & Over Expert Silver Medal World Champion

Professional

National Bicycle Association (NBA)
None
National Bicycle League (NBL)
1989 "B" Pro Grandnational Champion
1993 National No.1 Pro

American Bicycle Association (ABA)
1989 "A" (Junior) Pro Grandnational Champion
1989 "A" (Junior) Pro National No.1. Starting in the 1989 season the ABA started recognizing the highest ranking of its Junior pros. However, the ABA did not award its Junior pros with No.1 plate.
United States Bicycle Motocross Association (USBA)
None
International Bicycle Motocross Federation (IBMXF)
None
Pro Series Championships

Notable BMX accolades
Named one of eight top amateurs deemed top "Pros of the Future" by Super BMX & Freestyle magazine along with Billy Griggs, Mike King, Doug Davis, Matt Hadan Brent Romero, Darwin Griffin and Brad Birdwell.
Named one of BMX Action's "Terrible Ten" top amateurs and future professionals three consecutive times: 1986, 1987, 1988
Named eighth out of 21 racers deemed BMX's Hottest Amateurs in 1988 from a BMX Plus! poll of seven team managers which included Don Crupi of MCS, Mike Seevers of GT, Yvonne Shoup of Free Agent, Dave Custodero of Mongoose, Mike Donell of Revcore, Bill Nelson of Robinson and Racer/Team Manager of Diamond Back Harry Leary.

Racing traits and habits

Significant BMX injuries
Broke his thumb in hoarse play involving jumping up and down on a bumper of a rent a car at the NBL Memphis Classic National in Memphis, Tennessee March 25, 1988
Broke thumb in practice the day before ABA Fall Nationals in Yorba Linda, California on October 26, 1989

BMX press magazine interviews and articles
Terrible Ten Blurb. BMX Action May 1986 Vol.11 No.5 pg.72
"A New Superstar: Our Man Eric" Super BMX/Freestyle April 1987 Vol.14 No.4 pg.33 A very extensive interview with Carter.
"Eric Carter: Nine Longe Years To The Top" American BMXer June 1987 Vol.9 No.5 Extensive interview.
Terrible Ten Mini Bio. BMX Action August 1987 Vol.12 No.8 pg.38
"E. Carter: The Kid With All The Titles" BMX Action December 1987 Vol.12 No.12 pg.32
Terrible Ten Mini Bio. BMX Action October 1988 Vol.13 No.10 pg.22
"The Schwinn Race Team (AKA: Eric Carter)" Super BMX/Freestyle November 1988 Vol.15 No.11 pg.28 A mini interview with Schwinn's only national factory racer.
Side Bar mini-interview in BMX plus! June 1990 Vol.13 No.6 pg.68
"Directions: Psyche" Go September 1990 Vol.1 Issue 11 pg.68 Short Blurb on how to deal with the mental pressures of a big race.
"Young Guns!!!" BMX Plus! October 1990 Vol.13 No.10 pg.64 Joint interview with fellow rookie pros Steve Veltman, Tim Hall, Kenny May, and Matt Hadan.
"The Return of a Rager!" BMX Plus! August 1993 Vol.16 No.8 pg.31 mini interview of Eric's return to BMX racing full-time.

BMX magazine covers
Bicycle Motocross News:
None
Minicycle/BMX Action & Super BMX:
May 1986 Vol.13 No.5 In insert Dino Deluca.(SBMX&F)
April 1987 Vol.14 No.4 in insert. Main image: Freestyler George Holquin.(SBMX/F)
November 1988 Vol.15 No.11 In separate inserts Mike King & Pete Loncarevich; Jeff Donnell & Charlie Davidson; freestyler Eddie Fiola.
Bicycle Motocross Action & Go:
December 1987 Vol.12 No.12 (BMXA)
July 1991 Vol.2 Iss.9 in insert. Main Image is freestyler Jess Dyrenforth (Go).
BMX Plus!:
August 1989 Vol.12 No.8 in main image foreground (Schwinn) with Travis Chipres (Mongoose), Matt Hadan (obscured silver black/blue helmet), Mike King (obscured black/silver helmet with "1"), Billy Griggs (Redline), and GT's Mike Ellis. Also in top insert with aforementioned.
September 1992 Vol.15 No.9 in two inserts with Motorcycle Motocross (MX) racer Jeremy McGrath
August 1993 Vol.16 No.8 (25) with Brian Foster (1) at the lower left hand side. In insert Freestyler Matt Hoffman.
March 1994 Vol.17 No.3 (25) third from right on the starting gate with fellow pros (5) Brian Lopes (first from right), Mike King, Steve Veltman (on Carter's right), Pete Loncarevich (partly obscured) & and unidentified. In top insert Haro Monocoque BMX racing bicycle.
August 1994 Vol.17 No.8 in background with Gary Ellis in foreground.

Bicycles and Dirt (ABA publication):
None
BMX World: (1991-1992 version):
January 1991 Vol.1 No.2
Snap BMX Magazine & Transworld BMX:

BMX World: (2005–Present version):

Mountain Bike Action:

Moto Mag:
None
NBA World & NBmxA World (The official NBA/NBmxA membership publication): 
None
Bicycles Today & BMX Today (The official NBL membership publication under two names):

ABA Action, American BMXer, BMXer (The official ABA membership publication under three names):
American BMXer October 1985 Vol.7 No.8 and two unidentified racers.
American BMXer June 1987 Vol.9 No.5
USBA Racer (The official USBA membership publication):

Post BMX career
Following in the footsteps of other legendary pros Eric Carter became a pro mountain-biker in 1993 (while still racing BMX heavily). He currently races MTB for Mongoose Bicycles in the mountain-cross and downhill divisions. However, he does race BMX during the winter to cross train and enhance his MTB racing skills.

Mountain Bike Racing Career
Started Racing: 1993 at age 23.

Sub Discipline:

First Race Result:

Sanctioning Body:

Career MTB factory and major Non-factory sponsors

Amateur
No amateur status.

Professional
Barracuda: 1994-1995
Troy Lee Designs: 1996
Rotec/White Bros: 1997
GT (Gary Turner) Bicycles: December 1997-December 2000
Mongoose Bicycles (Formerly BMX Products)/Hyundai: January 2001–Present
GT Bicycles : January 2009–Present

Career Mountain Bike Racing (MTB) titles

Amateur
No amateur status.

Professional
Union Cycliste Internationale (UCI)
1998 Dual Slalom World Cup Bronze Medalist
1999 Dual Slalom World Cup Champion Gold Medalist
1999 Downhill World Champion Bronze Medalist
1999 World Cup Downhill Bronze Medalist
2001 World Cup Dual Slalom World Cup Silver Medalist
2002 World Cup 4-cross Bronze Medalist
2003 World Cup 4-cross Silver Medalist
2003 4-Cross World Champion Silver Medalist
2003 World Cup 4-cross Champion Gold Medalist
2004 4-cross World Champion Gold Medalist
National Off Road Bicycle Association (NORBA)
1999 National Downhill Champion Gold Medalist
1999 National Championship Series Dual Slalom Silver Medalist
2003 National Mountain-cross Series Champion Gold Medalist
2004 National Mountain-cross Series Champion
2003, 2005, 2006 United States National Mountain-cross Champion
2003 United States National Downhill Champion
USA Cycling
2005 & 2006 Mountain-cross National Champion

Notable MTB accolades
He is a 1999 winner of the Visa/USA Cycling Athlete of the Year Award.

MTB Product Lines
2006 Mongoose Eric Carter EC-X Four Cross Full Suspension Mountain Bike

Significant MTB injuries
Laid up for one year due to multiple injuries from mid-2004-September 2005
Broke Collar bone in May 2006

Miscellaneous
Eric Carter had substantial input on the design of the Hyper Metro pro sized frame of the early 1990, which he raced when sponsored by Hyper Designs.

References

External links
 Short Mountain biking career biography on Mongoose Bicycles website.
 Descent World Interview with Eric Carter on his MTB career.
 2007 Mongoose Bicycles interview.
 The American Bicycle Association (ABA) website.
 The National Bicycle League (NBL) website.

Living people
American male cyclists
BMX riders
1970 births
Downhill mountain bikers
Four-cross mountain bikers
UCI Mountain Bike World Champions (men)
American mountain bikers